The Buick Enclave is a three-row luxury crossover SUV produced by General Motors since 2007. It was previewed at the 2006 North American International Auto Show, officially as a concept car, making it the first Lambda vehicle to be displayed. The Enclave is partially based on the Buick Centieme concept shown at the 2003 Detroit Auto Show.

The first-generation Enclave, the Saturn Outlook, the original GMC Acadia, and the first-generation Chevrolet Traverse all shared the GM Lambda platform.

The Enclave replaced both of Buick's SUVs, the minivan-based Rendezvous and the truck-based Rainier, as well as the Terraza minivan. The second-generation Enclave was officially revealed at the 2017 New York International Auto Show.



First generation (2008)

Features 

The Enclave has seating for seven passengers, with an optional second row bench seat instead of the standard two captain chairs which increases the seating to eight. It comes standard with front-wheel drive with an option of all-wheel drive.

The Enclave shares powertrains with its Lambda siblings. For its first year of production, the Enclave was powered by a  3.6 L High Feature V6 engine mated to a six-speed automatic transmission. The latter direct-injection engine offers a broader torque curve, and brings fuel economy to / for FWD models and / for AWD models, according to the new United States Environmental Protection Agency estimates. The Lambda vehicles are built at GM's new Delta Township Assembly plant near Lansing, Michigan, and production of the Enclave commenced on April 11, 2007, with the first vehicles reaching certain dealers by the end of the month. The Enclave debuted with a starting price of $32,790.

In its first year of production, the Enclave was often criticized for its 6-speed transmission, which was "hesitant to downshift." The powertrain was improved for 2009. Buick's VentiPorts have reappeared at the Enclave's introduction, a styling feature unique to Buick dating back to 1949.

Initial sales of the Enclave far exceeded production capacity, forcing GM to add a third shift to the Delta Township plant.

With the arrival of the Buick Envision (which is slotted between the Enclave and Buick Encore) to North America in 2016 (for the 2017 model year), the Enclave will be bigger after Envision's debut, and the 2017 model year Enclave will be the last under the first generation platform.

2013 refresh 

GM unveiled the 2013 Buick Enclave on April 3, 2012, one day before its official debut at the New York Auto Show. The 2013 model features revised exterior styling including a new chrome waterfall grille, xenon headlights with LED running lights, LED Foglights, and LED taillights. Interior updates include a redesigned dashboard with more soft-touch materials, wood and chrome accents, blue ambient lighting, and touchscreen IntelliLink infotainment display. Among safety features are seven standard airbags, including an industry-first front center airbag, and available blind spot monitoring.

Markets 
Sales in the United States and Canada began in 2007 during the 2008 model year. In 2008, General Motors began exporting the Enclave to China, to be sold through Shanghai GM's Buick network.

The Buick brand has been relaunched in Mexico for the 2010 model year, bringing the Enclave to that market.

Second generation

North America (2018) 

On April 11, 2017, exactly ten years after the first Enclave was produced, Buick unveiled the second generation Enclave at the Pier 59 Studios during the 2017 New York International Auto Show. With the introduction of the compact Buick Envision in 2016 and the launching of the Opel Insignia-badged Buick Regal TourX wagon, the next generation Enclave moved upmarket, competing with the Volvo XC90, Infiniti QX60, and Acura MDX in the premium crossover SUV market. The second generation Enclave went on sale in the Fall of 2017 as a 2018 model.

The long-wheelbase version of GM’s C1XX chassis sharing the same platform with the Chevrolet Traverse, the second generation Enclave moved away from the egg-shaped design but retains some elements of the previous generation, displaying a sleeker aerodynamic appearance, a lower roofline, and the introduction of the Evonik Acrylite exterior forward lighting flanking Buick's new three-dimensional mesh grille with chrome wings.

Powered by a 3.6-liter V-6 mated to a new nine-speed automatic transmission, it produces  with  torque. The second generation Enclave comes in standard Front-drive or available with Intelligent AWD with an active twin-clutch rear differential, which complements its first switchable all-wheel-drive system. There are three level trims, including a new top-of-the-line premium Avenir sub-brand.

2022 refresh
Buick initially planned to launch an updated version of the Enclave in mid- to late 2020 as a 2021 model year vehicle. However, GM delayed launch and production of the updated Enclave to 2021 as 2022 model year vehicle.  The mid-cycle refresh adopts many design elements and features along with new LED headlights and taillights already seen on the Chinese version of the Buick Enclave.

The 2022 Enclave adds as standard a driver assistance safety suite previously only available in the Avenir trim. Features include front pedestrian braking, automatic emergency braking, lane keep assist, blind spot monitor, rear cross traffic alert, and rear parking sensor.  Other new features include a push-button transmission, optional head-up display, optional rear pedestrian alert, and wireless Android Auto and Apple CarPlay.

China (2020) 

On October 22, 2019, Buick unveiled the Chinese-market Enclave.  It is a "mid-size plus" version of the Enclave which utilizes GM's C1 short wheelbase platform.  It went on sale in that region in late 2019. While it has the similar features as the full-size North American Enclave, the Chinese version is shorter with a design different from its counterpart; there are no plans to make it available in North America. Buick planned to name the Chinese version "Envoy" (a name previously used on a GMC midsize SUV in North America from 1998 to 2007) but elected to use the Enclave name instead.

The Chinese Enclave features GM's Electronic Precision Shift technology, and is equipped exclusively with a turbocharged 2.0L LSY engine that makes , mated to the new GM nine-speed automatic transmission.

Sales

Awards 
The Enclave received the Best New SUV/CUV (over C$60,000) from the AJAC in 2008.

References

External links 

 

Enclave
Cars introduced in 2007
2010s cars
2020s cars
Full-size sport utility vehicles
Mid-size sport utility vehicles
Crossover sport utility vehicles
Luxury sport utility vehicles
Front-wheel-drive vehicles
All-wheel-drive vehicles
Vehicles built in Lansing, Michigan
Motor vehicles manufactured in the United States
Flagship vehicles